Ștefan Adrian Popescu (born 5 May 1993) is a Romanian professional footballer who plays as a left back.

Club career 

On 12 January 2012, Popescu made his debut for Cesena in a 1–2 away loss against Napoli. The game was part of the 2010–11 Coppa Italia and he scored the opening goal to give his team the lead.

Ajaccio
After his time with Cesena came to an end, Popescu moved to French side Ajaccio. He made his Ligue 1 debut on 25 August 2013, in a match against OGC Nice which ended 0–0. In January 2014, after only six months, he left Ajaccio after his contract was terminated on a mutual agreement, along with teammate and fellow Romanian Adrian Mutu.

References

External links
 

Sportspeople from Iași
1993 births
Living people
Romanian footballers
Romania under-21 international footballers
Romania youth international footballers
Association football defenders
Romanian expatriate footballers
A.C. Cesena players
Olympique de Marseille players
AC Ajaccio players
FC Astra Giurgiu players
Ternana Calcio players
Modena F.C. players
U.S. Salernitana 1919 players
FC Politehnica Iași (2010) players
Ligue 1 players
Liga I players
Serie B players
Romanian expatriate sportspeople in Italy
Romanian expatriate sportspeople in France
Expatriate footballers in Italy
Expatriate footballers in France